"When the Lights Go Out" is the second single released from British group Five's debut studio album, Five. It was released in early 1998. The song was co-written by the group alongside Eliot Kennedy, Tim Lever and Mike Percy (from the band Dead or Alive), and John McLaughlin. It was co-produced by Eliot Kennedy, Tim Lever and Mike Percy.

"When the Lights Go Out" is the band's only top ten hit in the United States. An alternate version of the song, in which J's rap is replaced by Abz's rap, was made exclusively for the US release; there are separate videos for each version. Five's biggest hit to date internationally, "When the Lights Go Out" is considered somewhat to be their debut single in most countries (except in the UK), peaking at number two in Australia, reaching the Top 30 in the US on 23 June 1998 and eventually spending seven nonconsecutive weeks at its peak of number 10, starting 21 July 1998. The song also spent six months on the US Billboard Hot 100, and sold 800,000 copies in the US alone.

Critical reception
Billboard wrote, "Does pop radio need yet another clique of young, videogenic harmonizers? The answer was a resounding no ... until the onset of Five, a U.K. quintet of cuties who swagger with undeniably sharp vocal precision and an appealing degree of soul. 'When The Lights Go Out' chugs with faux-funk authority and a crackling pop chorus. You will be irreversibly hooked on this tasty guilty pleasure long before the track reaches its conclusion. Voted best new act of 1997 by the teenybopper readers of Smash Hits in the U.K., Five are the first real reason the Backstreet Boys have had to look over their shoulders in a serious sweat." Can't Stop the Pop said that with the song, "Five demonstrated a sense of personality, identity and charisma far beyond that of just good marketing."

Rolling Stone ranked it number 67 in their list of 75 Greatest Boy Band Songs of All Time in 2020.

Music videos
The UK version (directed by duo Liam & Grant) starts with a woman using a VR machine and sees the members as they dance together and in separate rooms with each getting a distinct color: Abs in teal, Scott in orange, Ritchie in purple, Sean in blue and J in red. Through the woman's perspective, the viewers sees the members with a given number and their horoscope sign respectively.

The US version (directed by Nigel Dick) takes place at night in a closed bowling alley, where Abs takes control of the place and allows the other members and himself to hang out with a couple girls they brought along with them. One of the girls is played by Bethany Joy Lenz of Guiding Light and One Tree Hill fame.

Track listings
 

UK CD1
 "When the Lights Go Out" (radio edit)
 "When the Lights Go Out" (extended mix)
 "When the Lights Go Out" (The Drummers mix)
 "When the Lights Go Out" (Loop Da Loop full vocal mix)
 "When the Lights Go Out" (video)

UK CD2
 "When the Lights Go Out" (radio edit)
 "When the Lights Go Out" (Blacksmith R&B rub)
 "Slam Dunk (Da Funk)" (extended mix)
 Interview

UK cassette single
 "When the Lights Go Out" (radio edit)
 "When the Lights Go Out" (extended mix)

European CD single
 "When the Lights Go Out" (radio edit)
 "When the Lights Go Out" (Blacksmith R&B rub)

US CD and cassette single
 "When the Lights Go Out" (US remix) – 4:20
 "Straight Up Funk" – 3:57

US maxi-CD single
 "When the Lights Go Out" (US remix) – 4:20
 "When the Lights Go Out" (hip hop mix) – 6:19
 "When the Lights Go Out" (R&B rub mix) – 4:24
 "Shake" – 3:25

US 12-inch single
A1. "When the Lights Go Out" (radio mix)
A2. "When the Lights Go Out" (R&B rub mix)
B1. "When the Lights Go Out" (hip hop mix)
B2. "Shake"

Australian CD single
 "When the Lights Go Out" (radio edit)
 "When the Lights Go Out" (extended mix)
 "When the Lights Go Out" (Blacksmith R&B rub)
 "When the Lights Go Out" (The Drummers mix)
 "When the Lights Go Out" (Loop Da Loop full vocal mix)
 The Japanese CD single contains a sixth track: a shorter radio edit of "When the Lights Go Out".

Credits and personnel
Credits are lifted from the Five album booklet.

Studio
 Recorded at Steelworks Studios (Sheffield, England)

Personnel
 Eliot Kennedy – writing, production, mixing
 Tim Lever – writing, production, mixing
 Mike Percy – writing, production, mixing
 John McLaughlin – writing
 Five – writing

Charts

Weekly charts

Year-end charts

Certifications and sales

References

1997 songs
1998 singles
Five (band) songs
Music videos directed by Nigel Dick
Song recordings produced by Eliot Kennedy
Songs written by Abz Love
Songs written by Eliot Kennedy
Songs written by Jason "J" Brown
Songs written by Mike Percy (musician)
Songs written by Sean Conlon
Songs written by Tim Lever